Sergio Molina Rivero (born 14 November 1983) is a Spanish professional footballer who plays for Lincoln Red Imps as a forward.

References

External links

1983 births
Living people
Footballers from Málaga
Spanish footballers
Association football forwards
Segunda División players
Segunda División B players
Tercera División players
Atlético Malagueño players
Atlético Madrid B players
AD Ceuta footballers
Marbella FC players
Granada 74 CF footballers
Orihuela CF players
CD Puertollano footballers
Albacete Balompié players
Real Jaén footballers
Real Balompédica Linense footballers
Super League Greece players
Panthrakikos F.C. players
Spain youth international footballers
Spanish expatriate footballers
Spanish expatriate sportspeople in Greece
Expatriate footballers in Greece
Caravaca CF players
Gibraltar National League players